Lady Valiamma Narain (1869–1954) was a Tamil Indian immigrant coming from the city of Nagapatnam in the Madras Presidency of southern British India (present-day Nagapattinam, Tamil Nadu, India). Valiamma spent quite a few years on the island of Martinique where she, her mother Peruammal, her father Permal, and sister Alice were indentured. Valiamma, also known as Meme Veronique or Veronica, married at a very early age to a young man by the name of Matrizan and adapted to the French society. They had a daughter together: Anise. Problems arose between Valiamma and Matrizan's family, and Valiamma left Martinique with her daughter Anise who was 3 at the time, her mother Peruammal, and sister Alice around 1888 to arrive in Trinidad, where she worked with the De Boissiere family who owned the Champs Elysées Estate in Maraval, Trinidad and Tobago. Tamil, being her mother tongue she spoke French, English, and the lingua franca of Indo-Trinidadians, Hindustani fluently. Valiamma mastered in French culinary and was taught by her mother the art of massage. Her abilities were so high in demand, Valiamma built a great relationship with her clients and hosted parties and massage sessions.

Shortly after her arrival to Trinidad, Valiamma was around twenty when she was approached by a young Tamil Indian immigrant who settled in Trinidad and Tobago by the name of Narain. The two made an excellent match and Peruammal (Valiamma's mother) had arranged for them to marry and settle at her home on Cotton Hill. Narain had adopted Anise (Valiamma's daughter) from her first marriage and they together had several children of whom seven survived. In order: Julia, Victorine (known as Coopai or Sonny Ma), Mayotte, Edmund (known as Big Mammay), Emelda (known as Chuparee or Chennai Pati), John (known as Chinna Dada or Chinna Thamby), and Marie Louise (known as Susi). They all had Western and French names due to Valiamma being Roman Catholic. Alice (Valiama's younger sister) met a young man by the name of Gosine and settled in Todd's Road, Rio Claro, Trinidad and Tobago. Around 1900, when Anise was 15 years of age, she married a young man just 18 by the name of Tamby Pillai. Tamby's father, Shiva Subromaniam Pillai, had emigrated to Trinidad and Tobago from the city of Coimbatore in the South Indian state of Tamil Nadu on the John Allen Ship in 1873. They had eight children. in order: Pulleh, Babe, Armogam (known as Edward Joseph), Christo, Rita (known as Little Ma), Lucile, Elsie, and Sylvan (born in 1925).

Valiamma's mother grew old and they had to care for her. Some time after 1914, Peruammal died and was given a traditional Tamil Hindu funeral, with a horse-drawn hearse proceeded by drummers and pennies thrown in front of the moving hearse and collected by mourners with sacred prayers by the Pujari (Priest), She wasn't cremated as per Hindu customs, but buried at Lapeyrouse Cemetery, due to the ban of cremation in the British Empire. Suddenly after the birth of Valiamma's last child Susi, Narain died leaving her with their seven children and none were adults yet. Times were tough, but as usual, Valiamma supported her family with her profession of Culinary and Masseuse, and she also bought cows to generate dairy for sale. As Valiamma's children got older, they all married: Julia to Lutchman and they had 8 children: Gabriel, Nashug, Anthony, Prince, Edward, Kami, Mary, and Rita. Victorine to Chubbiah, and they had three children: Patricia (known as Batee), William (known as Sonny), and David Paul (known as Boyin). Mayotte to Muniappa Chetti (known as Arab) and they had 9 children: Rose (known as Akka), Ethel (known as Thangai Tantie), Patrick, Margaret (known as Dodo Tantie), John, Veronica (known as Vera), Lenora (known as Dolly), Dorothy, and Michael. Edmund to Helena Maycock. they had three children: Eugene, Muriel, and Jean. Emelda to Narayanasami Naidu from the village of Vadakalur in the North Arcot district of Tamil Nadu who descended from the Poilgar caste a sub-caste of the Kshatriya caste, they had 8 children, in order: Florence (known as Akka), Eugene (known as Clayton Dada ji), Peter (known as Sweeny Dada), Cecilia (known as Doreen), Robert (known as Tuggy Dada), Kelvin or Carlo (known as Bella Boy), Teresa (known as Daisy), and Loretta (known as Marion, born 1935). John did not have children of his own but was a father to all and adopted children in the village. Then Susi to Venkaya, who descended from the Kshatriya caste and was from Kerala. They had 8 children, in order: Cecil, Chrismah (known as Boysie), Beulah, Cyril, Angela, Jean, Gloria (known as Philomen), and Harold.

Lady Valiamma died in 1954 at the age of 85 years and was buried in Woodbrook-Mucurapo Cemetery in Mucurapo, Port of Spain, Trinidad and Tobago. She had 50 grandchildren, 70 great-grandchildren and 20 great-great-grandchildren.

References
de Verteuil, Anthony. 1989. Eight East Indian Immigrants: Gokool, Soodeen, Sookoo, Capildeo, Beccani, Ruknaddeen, Valiama, Bunsee 
Besson, Gerard. 2001.
The Angostura Historical Digest of Trinidad and Tobago: Valiama and Poleska 
The National Archives of Trinidad and Tobago
Alistair Sammy, Jean Narine, Dorothy Chetti Awai, The Pillai Family, Gloria Puls, Olivia Galera Sookram, Joanna Narine, Nellie Joseph, Anouska Sammy, Kelvin Sammy, Loretta Sammy, and Lucy Sammy Holford

1869 births
1954 deaths
Indian emigrants to Trinidad and Tobago
Burials in Trinidad and Tobago